Lloyd "Lucky" Gold (born September 6, 1950) is an American screenwriter and playwright.

Gold's plays have been produced at the Eugene O'Neill Theatre, the Seattle Repertory Theatre, the McCarter Theater and others.  He wrote numerous film scripts for Miramax and was script doctor on Marvin's Room and Shakespeare in Love.  He is co-creator of the PBS American Mystery Series, produced by Robert Redford and Rebecca Eaton.  Gold has written both series and long form for television including USA Network's Stealing Christmas.  He is the recipient of an NEA grant, 4 Emmys and 3 WGA Awards.

Positions held
All My Children
Breakdown Writer: May 19, 2011 - September 23, 2011

Another World
Script Writer: 1982 - 1985

As the World Turns (hired by Jean Passanante)
Co-Head Writer: June 7, 2010 - September 17, 2010
Breakdown Writer: October 6, 2009 - June 4, 2010

General Hospital
Breakdown Writer: April 10, 2017 – present

Guiding Light
Co-Head Writer: July 2001 - November 2002; August 22, 2008 - September 18, 2009
Script Writer: July 24, 2007 - February 29, 2008; April 14, 2008 - August 21, 2008
Breakdown Writer: November 2002 - July 23, 2007

One Life to Live
Script Writer: 1985 - 1997

The Young and the Restless
Breakdown Writer: January 9, 2014 - February 24, 2017

Awards and nominations
Daytime Emmy Awards

WINS
(1987 & 1994; Best Writing; One Life to Live)
(2007; Best Writing; Guiding Light)

NOMINATIONS 
(1985; Best Writing; Another World)
(1990, 1992, 1995 & 1996; Best Writing; One Life to Live)
(2003, 2005 & 2008; Best Writing; Guiding Light)
(2010 & 2011; Best Writing; As the World Turns)
(2012; Best Writing; All My Children)

Writers Guild of America Award

WINS
(1993 season; One Life to Live)
(2005 season; Guiding Light)
(2011 season; As the World Turns)

NOMINATIONS 
(1987 & 1995 seasons; One Life to Live)
(2003 & 2007 seasons; Guiding Light)
(2012 season; All My Children)

Head writing tenure

External links

American soap opera writers
American male television writers
1950 births
Living people
Daytime Emmy Award winners
Writers Guild of America Award winners